Pike Township may refer to:

Illinois
 Pike Township, Livingston County, Illinois

Indiana
 Pike Township, Jay County, Indiana
 Pike Township, Marion County, Indiana
 Pike Township, Ohio County, Indiana
 Pike Township, Warren County, Indiana

Iowa
 Pike Township, Muscatine County, Iowa

Kansas
 Pike Township, Lyon County, Kansas

Minnesota
 Pike Township, St. Louis County, Minnesota

Missouri
 Pike Township, Carter County, Missouri
 Pike Township, Stoddard County, Missouri

Ohio
 Pike Township, Brown County, Ohio
 Pike Township, Clark County, Ohio
 Pike Township, Coshocton County, Ohio
 Pike Township, Fulton County, Ohio
 Pike Township, Knox County, Ohio
 Pike Township, Madison County, Ohio
 Pike Township, Perry County, Ohio
 Pike Township, Stark County, Ohio

Pennsylvania
 Pike Township, Berks County, Pennsylvania
 Pike Township, Bradford County, Pennsylvania
 Pike Township, Clearfield County, Pennsylvania
 Pike Township, Potter County, Pennsylvania

Township name disambiguation pages